Mioawateria is a genus of sea snails, marine gastropod mollusks in the family Raphitomidae.

Species
Species within the genus Mioawateria include:
 † Mioawateria aitanga 
 Mioawateria asarotum 
 Mioawateria bigranulosa 
 Mioawateria ektonos 
 † Mioawateria expalliata  
 Mioawateria extensa 
 Mioawateria extensaeformis 
 † Mioawateria hondelattensis  
 Mioawateria malmii 
 † Mioawateria personata  
 Mioawateria rhomboidea 
 † Mioawateria sinusigera  
 Mioawateria vivens 
 Mioawateria watsoni 
Species brought into synonymy
 † Mioawateria depressispira  : synonym of Antiguraleus ula

References

 G. Wienrich and R. Janssen. 2007. Die Fauna des marinen Miozäns von Kevelaer (Niederrhein). Band 4 Gastropoda ab Mitridae. Backhuys Publishers BV Leiden 4:643-954
 Morassi & Bonfitto, New raphitomine gastropods (Gastropoda: Conidae: Raphitominae) from the South-West Pacific

External links
 
 Worldwide Mollusc Species Data Base: Raphitomidae
 Morassi, M.; Bonfitto, A. (2013). Three new bathyal raphitomine gastropods (Mollusca: Conoidea) from the Indo-Pacific region. Zootaxa. 3620(4)
  Bouchet, P.; Kantor, Y. I.; Sysoev, A.; Puillandre, N. (2011). A new operational classification of the Conoidea (Gastropoda). Journal of Molluscan Studies. 77(3): 273-308

 
Raphitomidae